Calochortus weedii is a North American species of flowering plants in the lily family known by the common name Weed's mariposa lily.

It is native to the Outer Southern California Coast Ranges and the Transverse Ranges in Southern California, and the Peninsular Ranges in Southern California and Baja California. It is a member of the chaparral flora. Most of the California locales occur between Santa Barbara County and San Diego County, but there is a report of an isolated population along Salmon Creek in southern Monterey County.

Description
Calochortus weedii is a perennial herb producing a slender, branching stem 30 to 90 centimeters tall.

There is a basal leaf up to 40 centimeters long which withers by the time the plant blooms.

The inflorescence bears 2 to 6 erect, widely bell-shaped to spreading flowers. Each flower has three narrow sepals and three wider and sometimes shorter petals, each segment up to 3 centimeters long. The petals are oval or wedge-shaped and may be any of a variety of colors, from cream to deep yellow to reddish purple. The petals often have reddish brown borders and flecks, and a coating of hairs on the inner surface.

The fruit is an angled capsule 4 to 5 centimeters long.

Varieties
 Calochortus weedii var. intermedius Ownbey - Orange, Los Angeles, + Riverside Counties
 Calochortus weedii var. peninsularis Ownbey - Baja California
 Calochortus weedii var. weedii - California + Baja California

formerly included 
Three taxa once considered varieties of Calochortus weedii are now generally classified as distinct species:
 Calochortus weedii var. obispoensis, now called Calochortus obispoensis
 Calochortus weedii var. purpurascens, now called Calochortus fimbriatus
 Calochortus weedii var. vestus, now called  Calochortus fimbriatus

References

External links
U.C. Photos gallery: Calochortus weedii

weedii
Flora of California
Plants described in 1868
Flora of Baja California
Natural history of the California chaparral and woodlands
Natural history of the California Coast Ranges
Natural history of the Peninsular Ranges
Natural history of the Transverse Ranges